Helgi Petersen (born 5 April 1978) is a retired Faroese football midfielder. He became Faroese league top goalscorer in 2001.

References

1978 births
Living people
Faroese footballers
NSÍ Runavík players
GÍ Gøta players
ÍF Fuglafjørður players
Association football midfielders
Faroe Islands international footballers